Typhlorhinini is a weevil tribe in the subfamily Entiminae.

Genera 
Cambefortinus – Cephalorostris – Hapactorrhynchus – Scrobops

References 

 Kuschel, G. 1954: La familia Nemonychidae en la Región Neotropical (Aporte 15 de Coleoptera Curculionidae). Revista chilena de historia natural (Impresa), 54(9): 97–126.
 Alonso-Zarazaga, M.A.; Lyal, C.H.C. 1999: A world catalogue of families and genera of Curculionoidea (Insecta: Coleoptera) (excepting Scolytidae and Platypodidae). Entomopraxis, Barcelona.

External links 

Entiminae
Polyphaga tribes